Stane Žilič (1897 – 1980) was a Slovenian gymnast. He competed in nine events at the 1924 Summer Olympics.

References

External links
 

1897 births
1980 deaths
Slovenian male artistic gymnasts
Olympic gymnasts of Yugoslavia
Gymnasts at the 1924 Summer Olympics
Sportspeople from Ljubljana